Cloud physics is the study of the physical processes that lead to the formation, growth and precipitation of atmospheric clouds.  These aerosols are found in the troposphere, stratosphere, and mesosphere, which collectively make up the greatest part of the homosphere.  Clouds consist of microscopic droplets of liquid water (warm clouds), tiny crystals of ice (cold clouds), or both (mixed phase clouds). Cloud droplets initially form by the condensation of water vapor onto condensation nuclei when the supersaturation of air exceeds a critical value according to Köhler theory. Cloud condensation nuclei are necessary for cloud droplets formation because of the Kelvin effect, which describes the change in saturation vapor pressure due to a curved surface. At small radii, the amount of supersaturation needed for condensation to occur is so large, that it does not happen naturally. Raoult's law describes how the vapor pressure is dependent on the amount of solute in a solution. At high concentrations, when the cloud droplets are small, the supersaturation required is smaller than without the presence of a nucleus.

In warm clouds, larger cloud droplets fall at a higher terminal velocity; because at a given velocity, the drag force per unit of droplet weight on smaller droplets is larger than on large droplets. The large droplets can then collide with small droplets and combine to form even larger drops. When the drops become large enough that their downward velocity (relative to the surrounding air) is greater than the upward velocity (relative to the ground) of the surrounding air, the drops can fall as precipitation. The collision and coalescence is not as important in mixed phase clouds where the Bergeron process dominates. Other important processes that form precipitation are riming, when a supercooled liquid drop collides with a solid snowflake, and aggregation, when two solid snowflakes collide and combine. The precise mechanics of how a cloud forms and grows is not completely understood, but scientists have developed theories explaining the structure of clouds by studying the microphysics of individual droplets.  Advances in weather radar and satellite technology have also allowed the precise study of clouds on a large scale.

History of cloud physics 

The modern cloud physics began in the 19th century and was described in several publications. Otto von Guericke originated the idea that clouds were composed of water bubbles. In 1847 Augustus Waller used spider web to examine droplets under the microscope. These observations were confirmed by William Henry Dines in 1880 and Richard Assmann in 1884.

Cloud formation: how the air becomes saturated

Cooling air to its dew point

Adiabatic cooling: rising packets of moist air

As water evaporates from an area of Earth's surface, the air over that area becomes moist.  Moist air is lighter than the surrounding dry air, creating an unstable situation.  When enough moist air has accumulated, all the moist air rises as a single packet, without mixing with the surrounding air.  As more moist air forms along the surface, the process repeats, resulting in a series of discrete packets of moist air rising to form clouds.

This process occurs when one or more of three possible lifting agents—cyclonic/frontal, convective, or orographic—causes air containing invisible water vapor to rise and cool to its dew point, the temperature at which the air becomes saturated. The main mechanism behind this process is adiabatic cooling. Atmospheric pressure decreases with altitude, so the rising air expands in a process that expends energy and causes the air to cool, which makes water vapor condense into cloud. Water vapor in saturated air is normally attracted to condensation nuclei such as dust and salt particles that are small enough to be held aloft by normal circulation of the air. The water droplets in a cloud have a normal radius of about 0.002 mm (0.00008 in). The droplets may collide to form larger droplets, which remain aloft as long as the velocity of the rising air within the cloud is equal to or greater than the terminal velocity of the droplets.

For non-convective cloud, the altitude at which condensation begins to happen is called the lifted condensation level (LCL), which roughly determines the height of the cloud base.  Free convective clouds generally form at the altitude of the convective condensation level (CCL). Water vapor in saturated air is normally attracted to condensation nuclei such as salt particles that are small enough to be held aloft by normal circulation of the air. If the condensation process occurs below the freezing level in the troposphere, the nuclei help transform the vapor into very small water droplets. Clouds that form just above the freezing level are composed mostly of supercooled liquid droplets, while those that condense out at higher altitudes where the air is much colder generally take the form of ice crystals. An absence of sufficient condensation particles at and above the condensation level causes the rising air to become supersaturated and the formation of cloud tends to be inhibited.

Frontal and cyclonic lift

Frontal and cyclonic lift occur in their purest manifestations when stable air, which has been subjected to little or no surface heating, is forced aloft at weather fronts and around centers of low pressure. Warm fronts associated with extratropical cyclones tend to generate mostly cirriform and stratiform clouds over a wide area unless the approaching warm airmass is unstable, in which case cumulus congestus or cumulonimbus clouds will usually be embedded in the main precipitating cloud layer. Cold fronts are usually faster moving and generate a narrower line of clouds which are mostly stratocumuliform, cumuliform, or cumulonimbiform depending on the stability of the warm air mass just ahead of the front.

Convective lift

Another agent is the buoyant convective upward motion caused by significant daytime solar heating at surface level, or by relatively high absolute humidity. Incoming short-wave radiation generated by the sun is re-emitted as long-wave radiation when it reaches Earth's surface. This process warms the air closest to ground and increases air mass instability by creating a steeper temperature gradient from warm or hot at surface level to cold aloft. This causes it to rise and cool until temperature equilibrium is achieved with the surrounding air aloft. Moderate instability allows for the formation of cumuliform clouds of moderate size that can produce light showers if the airmass is sufficiently moist. Typical convection upcurrents may allow the droplets to grow to a radius of about  before precipitating as showers.

If air near the surface becomes extremely warm and unstable, its upward motion can become quite explosive, resulting in towering cumulonimbiform clouds that can cause severe weather. As tiny water particles that make up the cloud group together to form droplets of rain, they are pulled down to earth by the force of gravity. The droplets would normally evaporate below the condensation level, but strong updrafts buffer the falling droplets, and can keep them aloft much longer than they would otherwise. The longer the rain droplets remain aloft, the more time they have to grow into larger droplets that eventually fall as heavy showers.

Rain droplets that are carried well above the freezing level become supercooled at first then freeze into small hail. A frozen ice nucleus can pick up  in size traveling through one of these updrafts and can cycle through several updrafts and downdrafts before finally becoming so heavy that it falls to the ground as large hail. Cutting a hailstone in half shows onion-like layers of ice, indicating distinct times when it passed through a layer of super-cooled water.

Convective lift can occur in an unstable air mass well away from any fronts. However, very warm unstable air can also be present around fronts and low-pressure centers, often producing cumuliform and cumulonimbiform clouds in heavier and more active concentrations because of the combined frontal and convective lifting agents. As with non-frontal convective lift, increasing instability promotes upward vertical cloud growth and raises the potential for severe weather. On comparatively rare occasions, convective lift can be powerful enough to penetrate the tropopause and push the cloud top into the stratosphere.

Orographic lift

A third source of lift is wind circulation forcing air over a physical barrier such as a mountain (orographic lift). If the air is generally stable, nothing more than lenticular cap clouds will form. However, if the air becomes sufficiently moist and unstable, orographic showers or thunderstorms may appear.

Non-adiabatic cooling
Along with adiabatic cooling that requires a lifting agent, there are three other main mechanisms for lowering the temperature of the air to its dew point, all of which occur near surface level and do not require any lifting of the air. Conductive, radiational, and evaporative cooling can cause condensation at surface level resulting in the formation of fog.  Conductive cooling takes place when air from a relatively mild source area comes into contact with a colder surface, as when mild marine air moves across a colder land area. Radiational cooling occurs due to the emission of infrared radiation, either by the air or by the surface underneath. This type of cooling is common during the night when the sky is clear. Evaporative cooling happens when moisture is added to the air through evaporation, which forces the air temperature to cool to its wet-bulb temperature, or sometimes to the point of saturation.

Adding moisture to the air
There are five main ways water vapor can be added to the air. Increased vapor content can result from wind convergence over water or moist ground into areas of upward motion. Precipitation or virga falling from above also enhances moisture content. Daytime heating causes water to evaporate from the surface of oceans, water bodies or wet land. Transpiration from plants is another typical source of water vapor. Lastly, cool or dry air moving over warmer water will become more humid. As with daytime heating, the addition of moisture to the air increases its heat content and instability and helps set into motion those processes that lead to the formation of cloud or fog.

Supersaturation 
The amount of water that can exist as vapor in a given volume increases with the temperature.  When the amount of water vapor is in equilibrium above a flat surface of water the level of vapor pressure is called saturation and the relative humidity is 100%. At this equilibrium there are equal numbers of molecules evaporating from the water as there are condensing back into the water. If the relative humidity becomes greater than 100%, it is called supersaturated. Supersaturation occurs in the absence of condensation nuclei.

Since the saturation vapor pressure is proportional to temperature, cold air has a lower saturation point than warm air.  The difference between these values is the basis for the formation of clouds.  When saturated air cools, it can no longer contain the same amount of water vapor.  If the conditions are right, the excess water will condense out of the air until the lower saturation point is reached.  Another possibility is that the water stays in vapor form, even though it is beyond the saturation point, resulting in supersaturation.

Supersaturation of more than 1–2% relative to water is rarely seen in the atmosphere, since cloud condensation nuclei are usually present. Much higher degrees of supersaturation are possible in clean air, and are the basis of the cloud chamber.

There are no instruments to take measurements of supersaturation in clouds.

Supercooling 

Water droplets commonly remain as liquid water and do not freeze, even well below .

Collision-coalescence 

One theory explaining how the behavior of individual droplets in a cloud leads to the formation of precipitation is the collision-coalescence process. Droplets suspended in the air will interact with each other, either by colliding and bouncing off each other or by combining to form a larger droplet. Eventually, the droplets become large enough that they fall to the earth as precipitation. The collision-coalescence process does not make up a significant part of cloud formation, as water droplets have a relatively high surface tension. In addition, the occurrence of collision-coalescence is closely related to entrainment-mixing processes.

Bergeron process 

The primary mechanism for the formation of ice clouds was discovered by Tor Bergeron. The Bergeron process notes that the saturation vapor pressure of water, or how much water vapor a given volume can contain, depends on what the vapor is interacting with. Specifically, the saturation vapor pressure with respect to ice is lower than the saturation vapor pressure with respect to water. Water vapor interacting with a water droplet may be saturated, at 100% relative humidity, when interacting with a water droplet, but the same amount of water vapor would be supersaturated when interacting with an ice particle. The water vapor will attempt to return to equilibrium, so the extra water vapor will condense into ice on the surface of the particle. These ice particles end up as the nuclei of larger ice crystals. Below , liquid water will spontaneously nucleate, and freeze. The surface tension of the water allows the droplet to stay liquid well below its normal freezing point. When this happens, it is now supercooled liquid water. The Bergeron process relies on super cooled liquid water (SLW) interacting with ice nuclei to form larger particles. If there are few ice nuclei compared to the amount of SLW, droplets will be unable to form. A process whereby scientists seed a cloud with artificial ice nuclei to encourage precipitation is known as cloud seeding. This can help cause precipitation in clouds that otherwise may not rain. Cloud seeding adds excess artificial ice nuclei which shifts the balance so that there are many nuclei compared to the amount of super cooled liquid water. An over seeded cloud will form many particles, but each will be very small. This can be done as a preventative measure for areas that are at risk for hail storms.

Cloud classification 

Clouds in the troposphere, the atmospheric layer closest to Earth, are classified according to the height at which they are found, and their shape or appearance.  There are five forms based on physical structure and process of formation. Cirriform clouds are high, thin and wispy, and are seen most extensively along the leading edges of organized weather disturbances. Stratiform clouds are non-convective and appear as extensive sheet-like layers, ranging from thin to very thick with considerable vertical development. They are mostly the product of large-scale lifting of stable air. Unstable free-convective cumuliform clouds are formed mostly into localized heaps. Stratocumuliform clouds of limited convection show a mix of cumuliform and stratiform characteristics which appear in the form of rolls or ripples.  Highly convective cumulonimbiform clouds have complex structures often including cirriform tops and stratocumuliform accessory clouds.

These forms are cross-classified by altitude range or level into ten genus types which can be subdivided into species and lesser types.  High-level clouds form at altitudes of 5 to 12 kilometers.  All cirriform clouds are classified as high-level and therefore constitute a single cloud genus cirrus.  Stratiform and stratocumuliform clouds in the high level of the troposphere have the prefix cirro- added to their names yielding the genera cirrostratus and cirrocumulus. Similar clouds found in the middle level (altitude range 2 to 7 kilometers) carry the prefix alto- resulting in the genus names altostratus and altocumulus.

Low level clouds have no height-related prefixes, so stratiform and stratocumuliform clouds based around 2 kilometres or lower are known simply as stratus and stratocumulus.  Small cumulus clouds with little vertical development (species humilis) are also commonly classified as low level.

Cumuliform and cumulonimbiform heaps and deep stratiform layers often occupy at least two tropospheric levels, and the largest or deepest of these can occupy all three levels. They may be classified as low or mid-level, but are also commonly classified or characterized as vertical or multi-level. Nimbostratus clouds are stratiform layers with sufficient vertical extent to produce significant precipitation. Towering cumulus (species congestus), and cumulonimbus may form anywhere from near the surface to intermediate heights of around 3 kilometres. Of the vertically developed clouds, the cumulonimbus type is the tallest and can virtually span the entire troposphere from a few hundred metres above the ground up to the tropopause. It is the cloud responsible for thunderstorms.

Some clouds can form at very high to extreme levels above the troposphere, mostly above the polar regions of Earth.  Polar stratospheric clouds are seen but rarely in winter at altitudes of 18 to 30 kilometers, while in summer, noctilucent clouds occasionally form at high latitudes at an altitude range of 76 to 85 kilometers.  These polar clouds show some of the same forms as seen lower in the troposphere.

Homospheric types determined by cross-classification of forms and levels.

 Homospheric types include the ten tropospheric genera and several additional major types above the troposphere. The cumulus genus includes four species that indicate vertical size and structure.

 Determination of properties 

Satellites are used to gather data about cloud properties and other information such as Cloud Amount, height, IR emissivity, visible optical depth, icing, effective particle size for both liquid and ice, and cloud top temperature and pressure.

 Detection 
Data sets regarding cloud properties are gathered using satellites, such as MODIS, POLDER, CALIPSO or ATSR. The instruments measure the radiances of the clouds, from which the relevant parameters can be retrieved. This is usually done by using inverse theory.

The method of detection is based on the fact that the clouds tend to appear brighter and colder than the land surface. Because of this, difficulties rise in detecting clouds above bright (highly reflective) surfaces, such as oceans and ice.

 Parameters 

The value of a certain parameter is more reliable the more satellites are measuring the said parameter. This is because the range of errors and neglected details varies from instrument to instrument. Thus, if the analysed parameter has similar values for different instruments, it is accepted that the true value lies in the range given by the corresponding data sets.

The Global Energy and Water Cycle Experiment uses the following quantities in order to compare data quality from different satellites in order to establish a reliable quantification of the properties of the clouds:

the cloud cover or cloud amount with values between 0 and 1
the cloud temperature at cloud top ranging from 150 to 340 K
the cloud pressure at top 1013 - 100 hPa
the cloud height, measured above sea level, ranging from 0 to 20 km
the cloud IR emissivity, with values between 0 and 1, with a global average around 0.7
the effective cloud amount, the cloud amount weighted by the cloud IR emissivity, with a global average of 0.5
the cloud (visible) optical depth varies within a range of 4 and 10. 
the cloud water path for the liquid and solid (ice) phases of the cloud particles
the cloud effective particle size'' for both liquid and ice, ranging from 0 to 200 μm

Icing 
Another vital property is the icing characteristic of various cloud genus types at various altitudes, which can have great impact on the safety of flying. The methodologies used to determine these characteristics include using CloudSat data for the analysis and retrieval of icing conditions, the location of clouds using cloud geometric and reflectivity data, the identification of cloud types using cloud classification data, and finding vertical temperature distribution along the CloudSat track (GFS).

The range of temperatures that can give rise to icing conditions is defined according to cloud types and altitude levels:
Low-level stratocumulus and stratus can cause icing at a temperature range of 0 to -10 °C.
For mid-level altocumulus and altostratus, the range is 0 to -20 °C.
Vertical or multi-level cumulus, cumulonimbus, and nimbostatus, create icing at a range of 0 to -25 °C.
High-level cirrus, cirrocumulus, and cirrostratus generally cause no icing because they are made mostly of ice crystals colder than -25 °C.

Cohesion and dissolution 
There are forces throughout the homosphere (which includes the troposphere, stratosphere, and mesosphere) that can impact the structural integrity of a cloud.  It has been speculated that as long as the air remains saturated, the natural force of cohesion that hold the molecules of a substance together may act to keep the cloud from breaking up.  However, this speculation has a logical flaw in that the water droplets in the cloud are not in contact with each other and therefore not satisfying the condition required for the intermolecular forces of cohesion to act.  Dissolution of the cloud can occur when the process of adiabatic cooling ceases and upward lift of the air is replaced by subsidence.  This leads to at least some degree of adiabatic warming of the air which can result in the cloud droplets or crystals turning back into invisible water vapor. Stronger forces such as wind shear and downdrafts can impact a cloud, but these are largely confined to the troposphere where nearly all the Earth's weather takes place. A typical cumulus cloud weighs about 500 metric tons, or 1.1 million pounds, the weight of 100 elephants.

Models
There are two main model schemes that can represent cloud physics, the most common is bulk microphysics models that uses mean values to describe the cloud properties (e.g. rain water content, ice content), the properties can represent only the first order (concentration) or also the second order (mass).
The second option is to use bin microphysics scheme that keep the moments (mass or concentration) in different for different size of particles.
The bulk microphysics models are much faster than the bin models but are less accurate.

See also
Hurricane dynamics and cloud microphysics

References

 
Articles containing video clips